
John Daly Burk (ca.1776–1808) was an Irish-born dramatist, historian and newspaperman in the United States in the late 18th and early 19th centuries. He died fighting a duel in Virginia in 1808.

Biography
Burk was probably born in Cork, Ireland circa 1772 and was raised Protestant. Burk attended Trinity College, Dublin. In Boston, Massachusetts, he edited the Polar Star newspaper, ca.1796. In New York he published The Time-Piece. In 1798 he settled in Virginia.

Burk's play Bunker-Hill premiered at the Haymarket Theatre, Boston, in 1797. "At that time it was well received, the British being well peppered, and the 'stars and stripes' floating triumphant. It was local in character, and the scene laid in Charlestown and Boston." According to J.T. Buckingham, "the tragedy had not a particle of merit, except its brevity. It was written in blank verse, if a composition having no attribute of poetry could be so called. It was as destitute of plot and distinctness of character as it was of all claim to poetry."  When U.S. President John Adams saw the play in New York and was asked his opinion afterward by actor Giles Leonard Barrett, who had portrayed General Warren, Adams replied "My friend, General Warren was a scholar and a gentleman, but your author has made him a bully and a blackguard."

References

Further reading

Works by Burk
 History of the Late War in Ireland. 1799
 John Daly Burk to Thomas Jefferson [1801]. The William and Mary Quarterly, Second Series, Vol. 5, No. 2 (Apr., 1925), pp. 98–102.
 History of Virginia. 1804

Plays
 Bunker-Hill: or The death of General Warren, an historic tragedy in five acts. NY: The Dunlap Society, 1891.
 Bethlem Gabor, Lord of Transylvania
 Female patriotism, or The death of Joan d'Arc

About Burk
 Joseph Tinker Buckingham. Specimens of newspaper literature: with personal memoirs, anecdotes, and reminiscences, v.2. Boston:  Little & Brown, 1850
 Charles Campbell. Some materials to serve for a brief memoir of John Daly Burk: author of a History of Virginia. With a sketch of the life and character of his only child, Judge John Junius Burk. Albany, NY: J. Munsell, 1868
 
 "Introduction." Burk. Bunker-Hill: or The death of General Warren, an historic tragedy in five acts. NY: The Dunlap Society, 1891
 Oscar Wegelin. "John Daly Burk." Early American plays, 1714-1830: a compilation of the titles of plays and dramatic poems written by authors born in or residing in North America previous to 1830, 2nd ed. NY: The Literary collector press, 1905
 Franklin Verzelius Newton Painter. "John Burk." Poets of Virginia. Atlanta: B. F. Johnson publishing company, 1907
 Joseph I. Shulim. John Daly Burk: Irish Revolutionist and American Patriot. Transactions of the American Philosophical Society, New Series, Vol. 54, No. 6 (1964), pp. 1–60
 Arthur Shaffer. John Daly Burk's "History of Virginia" and the Development of American National History. The Virginia Magazine of History and Biography, Vol. 77, No. 3 (Jul., 1969), pp. 336–346.

External links
 The Posterity Project
 UVA Library

1808 deaths
American people of Scotch-Irish descent
18th-century Irish people
19th-century Irish people
Irish emigrants to the United States (before 1923)
American dramatists and playwrights
18th-century Irish historians
People from Petersburg, Virginia
American newspaper editors
Duelling fatalities
18th century in Boston
Alumni of Trinity College Dublin
Year of birth uncertain
Journalists from Virginia